Cylistella is a genus of jumping spiders that was first described by Eugène Louis Simon in 1901.

Species
 it contains seven species, found in Panama, Costa Rica, Brazil, and Mexico:
Cylistella adjacens (O. Pickard-Cambridge, 1896) – Mexico, Costa Rica
Cylistella castanea Petrunkevitch, 1925 – Panama
Cylistella coccinelloides (O. Pickard-Cambridge, 1869) – Brazil
Cylistella cuprea (Simon, 1864) (type) – Brazil
Cylistella fulva Chickering, 1946 – Panama
Cylistella sanctipauli Soares & Camargo, 1948 – Brazil
Cylistella scarabaeoides (O. Pickard-Cambridge, 1894) – Mexico, Panama

References

External links 
 
 Photographs of Cylistella species from Brazil

Salticidae
Salticidae genera
Spiders of Brazil
Spiders of Central America
Spiders of Mexico